This article deals with the diplomatic affairs, foreign policy and international relations of Argentina. At the political level, these matters are handled by the Ministry of Foreign Affairs, also known as the Cancillería, which answers to the President. The current Minister of Foreign Affairs, since September 2021, is Chancellor (es: Canciller) Santiago Cafiero.

History

From isolation to nationhood 

Owing to its geographical remoteness, local authorities in what is today Argentina developed an early sense of autonomy. Based largely on economic needs, during colonial times their pragmatism led to a flourishing unofficial market in smuggled goods, out of the then-small port of Buenos Aires, in blatant contravention of the Spanish mercantilist laws. With the Enlightened despotism of the late-eighteenth-century Bourbon kings and the creation of the Viceroyalty of the Río de la Plata in 1776, trade increased as the political importance of the port-city of Buenos Aires soared. The urgency for a complete liberalization of commerce remained a powerful political cause for Criollos and Mestizos, further stimulated by the politically egalitarian and revolutionary ideals spread by the French and Anglo-American revolutions. Ultimately, the actual experience of successfully defending without Spanish aid the viceroyalty from a foreign invader during the 1806–1807 British invasions of the Río de la Plata, triggered a decisive quest for even greater autonomy from the colonial metropolis.

Between 1808 and 1810, the Napoleonic French Empire openly invaded Spain, after deposing King Ferdinand VII and taking him prisoner. A Spanish resistance formed an emergency government, the Supreme Central and Governing Junta of the Kingdom in order to govern themselves and the Spanish Empire in the absence of Ferdinand VII. But, when the Supreme Central Junta dissolved itself on 29 January 1810, under extreme pressure from Napoleonic forces, most of the main cities of Spanish America refused to acknowledge its successor, a Regency Council, as the legitimate depositary of sovereignty. They proceed to name their own local juntas, as a means to exercise government in the absence of the prisoner king.

On 25 May 1810, a Criollo-led cabildo abierto formally assumed the authority from Viceroy Baltasar Hidalgo de Cisneros. However, the ensuing United Provinces of South America (formed on the basis of the former Viceroyalty) declared itself independent on 9 July 1816, after Ferdinand VII was restored in 1815. During the Independence Wars no sovereign state recognized the United Provinces.

Until the fall of the Royalist stronghold of Lima in 1821, and the Battle of Ayacucho of 1824, territorial integrity was solely sustained by the military brilliance of Generals José de San Martín and Manuel Belgrano, the continuous efforts of northern provinces defenders Martín Miguel de Güemes and Juana Azurduy, among many others. However, during this same period, internecine power conflicts among diverse leaders, and ideological and economical struggles developed between Buenos Aires Province and much of the rest of the United Provinces, with many of the Provinces bonding themselves into a Federal League, inspired by Federalist José Gervasio Artigas' leadership. In practice, each side treated the other's grievances as a "foreign policy" matter.

The Unitarian Constitution of 1819 was immediately rejected by the provinces, and a state of anarchy ensued following the Battle of Cepeda. The only cause that could regain unity among the hostile factions was the 1825 invasion of what today is Uruguay on the part of Brazilian Empire. Uruguay, then known as the Province of the Eastern Bank of the Uruguay River, was considered a somewhat breakaway Province, since Montevideo served as the seat of the Royalist Viceroy Francisco Javier de Elío during its war on the May Revolution; and that, after the independentists victory, the Province became the main stronghold of the Federal League leader José Gervasio Artigas, who waged a long and bitter dispute during the 1810s against the Unitarians about the shape the national organization would have.

The war crisis led to a new Constitution and a first semblance of a united national government, at the same time it represented the first foreign policy crisis of the young nation (known as República Argentina, per the 1926 Constitution), as it forced the nation into war with Brazil.

The common cause the crisis provided did lead to enough institutional stability to have the British Empire recognize Argentina (as President James Monroe had the U.S. State Department done in 1822) and led to the election of the first President of Argentina. The opportunity for unity, however, was wasted largely because the new President, Bernardino Rivadavia, pushed a new Constitution even more biased towards Buenos Aires' agenda than the failed 1819 document. The war with Brazil, moreover, went badly. Land battles were won, early on, and despite some heroic feats on the part on Irish-born Admiral Guillermo Brown, the war dragged on, resulting in bankruptcy. This and the hated new constitution led to the end of the first republic by 1828; it also led, however, to peace with Brazil and the formation of an independent Uruguay.

26 September 1828 treaty itself became another foreign policy crisis, as it triggered a violent coup d'état by generals opposed to what they saw as a unilateral surrender. The murder of the man responsible for the treaty, Buenos Aires Governor Manuel Dorrego, itself led to a countercoup that brought with it the promise of a lasting peace; but eventually led to destabilizing consequences.

The countercoup brought in a new governor for the Buenos Aires Province, who would in time become the leading figure of a loose confederation of Argentine Provinces (the so-called Argentine Confederation). Juan Manuel de Rosas made it his mission to stabilize Argentina in a confederacy under the tutelage of Buenos Aires Province. This led to repression, massacres of Native Americans in the Pampas and, in 1838, an international embargo over the case of a French journalist tortured to death at Rosas' orders. An unyielding Rosas might have let the impasse continue for a decade or more; but, Admiral Guillermo Brown made his talents amenable once again, forcing the French blockade to be lifted in 1841.

Having come to power avenging the murder of a man who had decided to cease interference in Uruguay, Rosas invaded Uruguay upon the 1842 election of a government there antagonistic to his personal commercial interests (mainly centered in the export of cow hides and beef jerky, valuable commodities in those days). Commercially close with the French and British Empires, Uruguay's crisis met with swift reprisals against Rosas and the Argentine Confederacy from the two mighty powers. Slapped with fresh embargoes and a joint blockade, Argentina by 1851 found itself bankrupt and with "rogue nation" standing; on 3 February 1852, a surprise military campaign led by the Governor of Entre Ríos Province, Justo José de Urquiza, put an end to the Rosas regime and, until 1878, at least, serious Argentine foreign policy misadventures.

Constitution and conflict resolution 

The deposition of Rosas led to Argentina's present institutional framework, outlined in the 1853 constitution. The document, drafted by a legal scholar specializing in the interpretation of the United States Constitution put forth national social and economic development as its overriding principle. Where foreign policy was concerned, it specifically put emphasis on the need to encourage immigration and little else, save for the national defense against aggressions. This, of course, was forced into practice by Paraguayan dictator Francisco Solano López's disastrous 1865 invasion of northern Argentine territory, leading to an alliance between 1820s-era adversaries Argentina, Brazil and Uruguay and the loss of hundreds of thousands of lives (particularly Paraguay's own).

Setbacks notwithstanding, the policy was successful. Domestically, Argentina was quickly transformed by immigration and foreign investment into, arguably, the most educationally and economically advanced nation in Latin America. Whatever else was happening domestically, internationally, Argentine policy earned a reputation for pragmatism and the reliance of conflict resolution as a vehicle to advance national interests. The era's new strongman, Gen. Julio Roca, was the first Argentine leader to treat foreign policy on equal footing with foreign investment and immigration incentives, universal education and repression as instruments of national development. His first administration occupied Patagonia and entered into an 1881 agreement with Chile to that effect and his second one commissioned archaeologist Francisco Moreno to survey an appropriate boundary between the two neighbors, which brought Chile into the historic 1902 pact, settling questions over Patagonian lands east of the Andes. Later that year, endorsed his Foreign Secretary's successful negotiation of a debt dispute between Venezuela, France and Germany. Foreign Secretary Luis Drago's proposal in this, a dispute among third parties, became the Drago Doctrine, part of international law to this day.

This success led to a joint effort between Argentina, Brazil and Chile to negotiate a peaceful resolution to the United States' occupation of Veracruz, Mexico in April 1914. That May, the three nations' foreign ministers hosted U.S. officials in Canada, a conference instrumental in the withdrawal of U.S. troops that November. This also resulted in the 1915 ABC pact signed between the three and, like Brazil and Chile, Argentina thereafter pursued a pragmatic foreign policy, focused on preserving favorable trade relationships. This policy was in evidence during the 1933 Roca-Runciman Treaty, which secured Argentine markets among British colonies, and in the Argentine position during the Chaco War. Resulting from the 1928 discovery of petroleum in the area, the dispute developed into war after Bolivia's appeal for Argentine intervention in what it saw as Paraguayan incursions into potentially oil-rich lands were rejected. Bolivia invaded in July 1932 and, despite its legitimate claim to what historically had been its territory, its government's ties to Standard Oil of New Jersey (with whom the Argentine government was in dispute over its alleged pirating of oil in Salta Province) led Buenos Aires to withhold diplomatic efforts until, in June 1935, a cease-fire was signed. The laborious negotiations called in Buenos Aires by Argentine Foreign Minister Carlos Saavedra Lamas yielded him Latin America's first Nobel Prize for Peace in 1936 and a formal peace treaty in July 1938.

World War II

As they had during World War I, Argentine governments of different ideological stripes remained consistent in one important foreign policy point: they maintained Argentina neutral, preferring to offer the nation's vast agricultural export capacity to British and U.S. wartime needs; indeed, Argentine trade surpluses totalled US$1 billion during World War I and US$1.7 billion during World War II.

In early 1945, the United States and 19 Latin American countries met in Mexico at the Inter-American Conference on Problems of War and Peace. Argentina was not invited. The conference demanded that Argentina declare war on Germany or else it would be isolated. Argentina did so on  27 March 1945, and kept its status in the Pan-American Union and at the insistence of Latin American delegations was admitted to the new United Nations.

Cold War

The incipient Cold War in evidence following World War II led the new administration of Juan Perón to conclude that a third world war might follow. Perón restored diplomatic relations with the Soviet Union and, in 1949, articulated a "third way" as his foreign policy doctrine, in hopes of avoiding friction with either superpower, while opening the door to grain sales to the perennially shortage-stricken Soviets. Though commercial concerns continued to dominate foreign policy, conflict resolution was again ventured into when President Arturo Frondizi initiated negotiations between U.S. President John F. Kennedy and Cuban representative Ernesto Che Guevara during a Western Hemisphere summit in Uruguay in August 1961. Frondizi followed these exchanges with private discussions with Che Guevara in Buenos Aires, a misstep resulting in the Argentine military's opposition to further talks. Ultimately, Cuba was expelled from the Organization of American States in January 1962 and Frondizi was forced by the military to resign that March. The effort, though fruitless, showed audacity on the part of Frondizi, whom President Kennedy called "a really tough man."

A stray from precedent 

Argentina's relations with its neighbor Chile, though generally cordial, have been strained by territorial disputes – mostly along their mountainous shared border – since the nineteenth century.

In 1958 the Argentine Navy shelled a Chilean lighthouse during the Snipe incident.

On 6 November 1965 the Argentine Gendarmerie killed Chilean Lieutenant Hernán Merino Correa, member of Carabineros de Chile in the Laguna del Desierto incident.

In 1978 the bellicose Argentine dictatorship abrogated the binding Beagle Channel Arbitration and started the Operation Soberania in order to invade Chile but aborted it a few hours later due to military and political reasons. The conflict was resolved after the Argentine defeat in the Falklands by Papal mediation in the Beagle conflict of Pope John Paul II and in the form of a Treaty of Peace and Friendship of 1984 between Chile and Argentina ("Tratado de Paz y Amistad"), granting the islands to Chile and most of the Exclusive economic zone to Argentina; since then, other border disputes with Chile have been resolved via diplomatic negotiations.

The military dictatorship in Argentina invaded and occupied the British-controlled Falkland Islands on 2 April 1982, starting the Falklands War. The war lasted 74 days before an Argentine surrender on 14 June. The war cost the lives of nearly a thousand Argentine and British troops as well as three Falkland Islanders. It dealt the dictatorship a humiliating blow, opening the door for the return of a democratically elected government.

Since the return of civilian rule to Argentina in 1983, relations with Chile, the United Kingdom and the international community in general improved and Argentine officials have since publicly ruled out interpreting neighboring countries' policies as any potential threat; but Argentina still does not enjoy the full trust of the Chilean political class.

Michel Morris stated that Argentina has used threats and force to pursue its claims against Chile and Great Britain and that some of the hostile acts or armed incidents appear to have been caused by zealous local commanders.

Menem Presidency 
Early on in the administration of President Carlos Menem (1989–1999), Argentina restored diplomatic relations with the United Kingdom and developed a strong partnership with the United States. It was at this time that Argentina left the Non-Aligned Movement and adopted a policy of "automatic alignment" with the United States. In 1990, Menem's Foreign Minister, Guido di Tella, memorably pronounced the U.S.–Argentine alliance to be a "carnal relationship."

Argentina was the only Latin American country to participate in the 1991 Gulf War and all phases of the Haiti operation. It has contributed to United Nations peacekeeping operations worldwide, with Argentine soldiers/engineers and police/Gendarmerie serving in El Salvador–Honduras–Nicaragua (where Navy patrol boats painted white were deployed), Guatemala, Ecuador–Peru, Western Sahara, Angola, Kuwait, Cyprus, Croatia, Kosovo, Bosnia and East Timor.

In recognition of its contributions to international security and peacekeeping, U.S. President Bill Clinton designated Argentina as a major non-NATO ally in January 1998. The country is currently of two in Latin America that hold this distinction, the other being Brazil.

At the United Nations, Argentina supported United States policies and proposals, among them the condemnations of Cuba on the issue of human rights, and the fight against international terrorism and narcotics trafficking. In November 1998, Argentina hosted the United Nations conference on climate change, and in October 1999 in Berlin, became one of the first nations worldwide to adopt a voluntary greenhouse gas emissions target.

Argentina also became a leading advocate of non-proliferation efforts worldwide. After trying to develop nuclear weapons during the 1976 military dictatorship, Argentina scrapped the project with the return of democratic rule in 1983, and became a strong advocate of non-proliferation efforts and the peaceful use of nuclear technologies.

Since the return of democracy, Argentina has also turned into strong proponent of enhanced regional stability in South America, the country revitalized its relationship with Brazil; and during the 1990s (after signing the Treaty of Peace and Friendship of 1984 between Chile and Argentina) settled lingering border disputes with Chile; discouraged military takeovers in Ecuador and Paraguay; served with the United States, Brazil and Chile as one of the four guarantors of the Ecuador–Peru peace process. Argentina's reputation as a mediator was damaged, however, when President Menem and some members of his cabinet were accused of approving the illegal sale of weapons to Ecuador and to Croatia.

In 1998, President Menem made a state visit to the United Kingdom, and the Prince of Wales reciprocated with a visit to Argentina. In 1999, the two countries agreed to normalize travel to the Falkland Islands from the mainland and resumed direct flights.

In the 1990s, Argentina was an enthusiastic supporter of the Summit of the Americas process, and chaired the Free Trade Agreement of the Americas (FTAA) initiative.

Kirchner Presidency 

Within the term of President Néstor Kirchner, from 2003 onwards, Argentina suspended its policy of automatic alignment with the United States and moved closer to other Latin American countries. Argentina no longer supports the UN Commission on Human Rights resolution criticizing the "human rights situation in Cuba" and calling upon the Government of Cuba to "adhere to international human rights norms", but has chosen instead to abstain. In the 2006 United Nations Security Council election, Argentina supported, like all Mercosur countries, the candidacy of Venezuela (a Mercosur member) over Guatemala for a non-permanent seat in the Security Council.

The Mercosur has become a central part of the Argentine foreign policy, with the goal of forming a Latin American trade bloc. Argentina has chosen to form a bloc with Brazil when it comes to external negotiations, though the economic asymmetries between South America's two largest countries have produced tension at times.

Between 4 and 5 November 2005, the city of Mar del Plata hosted the Fourth Summit of the Americas. Although the themes were unemployment and poverty, most of the discussion was focused on the FTAA. The summit was a failure in this regard, but marked a clear split between the countries of the Mercosur, plus Venezuela, and the supporters of the FTAA, led by the United States, Mexico and Canada. FTAA negotiations have effectively stalled until at least the conclusion of the 2006 Doha round global trade talks.

In 2005, Argentina assumed again (see history here ) the two-year non-permanent position on the UN Security Council.

As of 2007, during Kirchner's almost four years in power, Argentina entered into 294 bilateral agreements, including 39 with Venezuela, 37 with Chile, 30 with Bolivia, 21 with Brazil, 12 with China, 10 with Germany, 9 with the United States and Italy, and 7 with Cuba, Paraguay, Spain and Russia.

Macri Presidency 

Mauricio Macri started his term with a series of foreign policy objectives: (i) re-invigorate bilateral relations with the US and Europe, (ii) revise the foundations of Mercosur, evaluating (together with Brazil) alternatives that imply more free trade and (iii) go back to a single exchange rate, allow for a revival of commodity exports and attract foreign direct investment. However, the realization of these objectives will depend on the evolution of domestic (the fate of Kirchnerism) and regional (the fate of the PT in Brazil) developments.

Issues

Sovereignty claims 

Argentina claims part of Antarctica as Argentine Antarctica, an area delimited by the 25° West and 74° West meridians and the 60° South parallel. This claim overlaps the British and Chilean claims, though all territorial claims in Antarctica are currently suspended under the Antarctic Treaty System. Argentina also claims the British overseas territories of the Falkland Islands and South Georgia and the South Sandwich Islands.

Argentina claims to have spent 11 years investigating the matter and submitted  of documents in support of the claim. If the claim is recognised by the UN then Argentina will gain the rights to the commercial exploitation of the sea bed (which includes mining and oil drilling). The new claim will add to the existing  of commercial shelf already managed by Argentina and includes the disputed British overseas territories of the Falklands, South Georgia and the South Sandwich Islands and parts of Antarctica disputed with Chile and the United Kingdom.

However, this ruling did not increase Argentina's Exclusive Economic Zone (EEZ) which is calculated differently and over which the CLCS has no authority to make a determination. In fact, the CLCS finding is likely to strengthen the UK’s claim to the contested seabed around the islands because the CLCS finding makes it more likely that the seabed between the islands and the Argentine mainland needs to be shared. The UN CLCS ruling included a caveat referencing the unresolved diplomatic dispute between Argentina and the United Kingdom over the Falkland Islands.

Other incidents 
Argentina, through its Coast Guard and Navy, has been traditionally greatly involved in fishery protection in the Argentine Sea with the first major incidents tracing back to the 1960s when a destroyer fired and holed a Russian trawler and continued through recent years.

In November 2006, an Argentine judge issued an arrest warrant for former Iranian President Akbar Hashemi Rafsanjani and eight other ex-officials in relation to the 1994 bombing of the Jewish-Argentine Mutual Association (AMIA) community center in Buenos Aires which killed 85 people. Iran refused to carry out the arrest demanded by the warrant claiming it to be a "Zionist plot". As a result, President Néstor Kirchner ordered the security forces to be on the alert for incidents similar to the 1994 bombing.

Argentina has a dispute with neighboring Uruguay about two pulp mills on the Uruguay side of the shared Uruguay River near the Argentine city of Gualeguaychú. Residents of Gualeguaychú, concerned about pollution from the mills, blockaded bridges across the river in 2006. The case was brought before the International Court of Justice. Meanwhile, the denial of preliminary measures in July 2006 allowed the mills to begin functioning. An ICJ decision was released in 2010. It found that Uruguay had broken its 1985 treaty obligation to consultant Argentina before building the mills but that Argentine claims of pollution caused by the new mills were not backed by the evidence.

Africa

Americas

Asia

Europe

Oceania

See also 
 Argentine energy crisis (2004)
 Argentine irredentism
 List of Canciller (Foreign Minister) of Argentina
 List of diplomatic missions in Argentina
 List of twin towns and sister cities in Argentina
 List of violent incidents at the Argentine border
 Military of Argentina
 State-Church relations in Argentina (for relations with the Holy See)
 Visa requirements for Argentine citizens

References

Further reading
 Escudé, Carlos. Foreign policy theory in Menem's Argentina (U Press of Florida, 1997)
 Francis, Michael J. The limits of hegemony: United States relations with Argentina and Chile during World War II. (University of Notre Dame Press, 1977)
 Leonard, Thomas M., and John F. Bratzel, eds. Latin America During World War II (Rowman & Littlefield, 2007)
 Sheinin, David MK. "Peripheral Anti-Imperialism: The New Revisionism and the History of Argentine Foreign Relations in the Era of the Kirchners." Estudios Interdisciplinarios de América Latina y el Caribe (2014) 25#1 Online, with a guide to the Spanish language historiography.
 Sheinin, David M. K. Argentina And the United States: An Alliance Contained (2006)
 Schmidli, William Michael. The Fate of Freedom Elsewhere: Human Rights and U.S. Cold War Policy toward Argentina (2013)  Excerpt
 Smith, Wayne S., ed. Toward resolution?: the Falklands/Malvinas dispute (Lynne Rienner Publishers, 1991)
 Tulchin, Joseph S. Argentina and the United States: A Conflicted Relationship (Macmillan Reference USA, 1990)

 
 Historia de las Relaciones Exteriores Argentinas  by Carlos Escudé and Andrés Cisneros
 Historical Dictionary of Argentina. London: Scarecrow Press, 1978.

External links 
 Ministerio de Relaciones Exteriores, Comercio Internacional y Culto – Official website of the Argentine Ministry of Foreign Relations, International Trade and Worship.
 The Special Relationship between Argentina and Brazil
 Historia de las Relaciones Exteriores Argentinas. Obra dirigida por Carlos Escudé y Andrés Cisneros. Obra desarrollada y publicada bajo los auspicios del Consejo Argentino para las Relaciones Internacionales (CARI), en el contexto de las tareas de su Centro de Estudios de Política Exterior (CEPE). 

 
Government of Argentina
Politics of Argentina